Guns of Fort Defiance is a 1981 video game published by The Avalon Hill Game Company.

Gameplay
Guns of Fort Defiance is a game in which the player is in command of a gun crew in the War of 1812.

Reception
Johnny L. Wilson reviewed the game for Computer Gaming World, and stated that "Guns of Fort Defiance is an exciting addition to a game library because: 1) it offers a challenging game without tying the player up for long time periods; 2) it's easy to teach the mechanics to a beginner; and 3) the handicap system enables the game to grow with your own ability."

References

External links
Book of Atari Software 1983

1981 video games
Apple II games
Atari 8-bit family games
Avalon Hill video games
Commodore 64 games
Commodore PET games
Fixed shooters
TRS-80 games
Video games developed in the United States
Video games set in the 19th century
Video games set in the United States
War of 1812 fiction